The Crossover is an upcoming sports drama television series based on the novel of the same name by Kwame Alexander.
It is set to be released on April 4, 2023 on Disney Channel and April 5, 2023 on Disney+.

Premise
Brothers Josh and JB Bell are considered basketball phenomena, and navigate their lives entering adulthood as well as the growth of their family.

Cast

Main
 Jalyn Hall as Josh Bell
 Amir O'Neil as JB Bell
 Derek Luke as Chuck Bell
 Sabrina Revelle as Crystal Bell
 Skyla I'Lece as Alexis
 Deja Monique Cruz as Maya
 Trevor Raine Bush as Vondle

Recurring
 Himie Freeman as Future Josh 
 Darone Okolie as Future JB
 Gabriela Lopez as Future Maya
 Joel Steingold as Basil St. John
 Johnny Cantley as Future Vondie
 Yvonne Senat Jones as Janice

Production
Disney+ ordered a pilot for the adaptation of the novel in May 2021, with Jalyn Hall and Amir O'Neil cast to star. In June, Derek Luke, Sabrina Revelle, Skyla I'Lece, Deja Monique Cruz and Trevor Raine Bush were added to the cast.

The series was officially greenlit in January 2022, with LeBron James' production company SpringHill Entertainment joining the production. In February, Daveed Diggs was cast to narrate the series. In July, it was announced Darone Okolie, Gabriela Lopez, Joel Steingold, Himie Freeman, and Johnny Cantley were cast in recurring roles. Yvonne Senat Jones would also join in a recurring role in October.

Filming began in June 2022.

On January 13, 2023, it was announced that the series would premiere on April 4, 2023 on Disney Channel and would be released the very next day on Disney+.

References

External links

Upcoming drama television series
English-language television shows
Disney+ original programming
Television shows based on American novels
American black television series
2020s American drama television series
American sports television series
Basketball television series
Coming-of-age television shows
Television series by 20th Century Fox Television
Television series about families
Television series by SpringHill Entertainment